Simon III may refer to:

 Simon III, Count of Saarbrücken (c. 1180–1243)
 Simon III, Count of Sponheim-Kreuznach (>1330–1414)
 Simon III, Lord of Lippe (c. 1340–1410)
 Simon III of Isenburg-Kempenich (ruled 1367–1420)